Walga
may refer to:

 Walga village a locality in Poland
 Walga Rock a rock in Western Australia
 WALGA an organisation in Western Australia